Narahenpita is a municipal ward of Colombo. Located at the South-Eastern corner and served by the Kelani Valley Railway Line, many government institutions including the National Blood Bank, the Survey Department, the Labor Ministry and several departments of the Health Ministry are situated in the area as well as several major private hospitals in the country.

Hospitals
Presently, Narahenpita has become the new hospital town and district. The main private hospitals are located here. 
Kings Hospital
Asiri Hospital
Asiri Surgical Hospital
Lanka Hospital
Ninewells Hospital
Army Hospital
Police Hospital

Populated places in Western Province, Sri Lanka